Barrington High School is a public four-year high school located in Barrington, Illinois, a northwest suburb of Chicago, Illinois, in the United States. It is part of Barrington Community Unit School District 220.

History

Original structure
Although the village of Barrington incorporated in 1865, the area did not have a dedicated permanent high school until 1949.  Before that, Barrington had a K-12 school on Hough Street. On February 8, 1947, the village held an election to choose a site for a new high school. Of approximately 1,414 ballots cast, 1,013 were cast in favor of selecting the current location on West Main Street.  Voters also granted the village authority to purchase the 70-acre site, issue bonds for the high school's construction, and build the high school.  The original purchase price for the site was $37,000.00. At the time, some residents complained that the tract bought had been too large; the opposition countered that unless the tract stretched far to the north, other residents and/or businesses might purchase that land, and the board would not be able to buy the land as cheaply later.  The Consolidated High School Board of Education, now Community Unit School District 220, consulted authorities on location, educational needs and the most fitting type of building allowing for future planning. The board engaged the architectural firm of Perkins and Will to design the original structure. The village issued $940,000.00 in bonds for the site and building; however, due to rising construction prices at the time, the high school as planned could not be completed for that amount.  On June 12, 1948, an election increased the authorization for such bonds by an additional $328,000.00 by a decision of 388 to 71. Groundbreaking on the high school took place on July 10, 1948, and engineer George Gilfeather supervised the ensuing construction almost daily. Classes began in the new building on September 12, 1949 under Superintendent F.C. Thomas.

Additions and expansions
In February 1955, an election to expand the high school granted a bond issue of $850,000.00 by a vote of 880 to 117.  These funds were used to add a wing to the west end of the building that connected the school to the gymnasium and add a second story to the original building at the north end; these additions were completed in September 1956. On November 8, 1958, voters permitted bonds in the amount of $1,600,000.00 to be used for a further addition on the east side of the building, including twenty-three classrooms, an auxiliary gymnasium, and an auditorium. These improvements began in 1959 and were completed in the fall of 1960. In 1999, Barrington voters approved an additional bond issuance for substantial remodeling and expansion of the high school.  This expansion included updating the building's classroom and athletic facilities as well as adding additional accommodations for the school's approximately 2,400 students.

Academics
Barrington High School reported that, in 2011, its students scored a composite average of 25 on the ACT college entrance exam, which is reportedly the highest average in the school's history and roughly four points higher than the state and national averages. The school is ranked #553 on Newsweek's 2008 list of the 1,300 best public high schools in America. Ninety-eight percent of Barrington's graduates enroll in college or post-graduate training programs. However, as of 2008, the State of Illinois found that Barrington had not made Adequate Yearly Progress as a part of the federal No Child Left Behind Act, as multiple student sub-groups failed to make minimum progress.

According to the College Board, Barrington High School ranks in the top 1% of more than 14,350 high schools both nationally and internationally for the number of AP exams taken by students. District 220 has received the 2004 Bright A+ award for academic excellence from SchoolSearch. Barrington schools rank in the top 5% of Illinois districts, and SchoolMatch has selected District 220 as being among the top 16% of the nation's public school districts being recognized through their Educational Effectiveness Audits. The Physics Program, developed over 25 years, was featured in a PBS documentary produced by Kurtgwbusdeagts Productions and in "Beyond 2000", an Australian television production. The Fine Arts Department is also one of the most comprehensive in Illinois. The studio-based art program received a state award for excellence, and an in-house gallery features regional and professional artists. The music department has received two consecutive Grammy Awards for outstanding programs..

Fine Arts
In 2013, Barrington High School's Chamber Choir, formerly under the direction of Nancie Kozel-Tobison, was among 5 high school choral programs in the United States to perform in a choir festival in Carnegie Hall run by Choirs of America. Vocal ensembles, including madrigal groups, have performed at the White House, the Sydney Opera House, Chicago's Orchestra Hall, the Kennedy Center, the Capitol Hill Club, the Supreme Court, and the Goodman Theater, among other venues, festivals, and competitions.

Athletics

The school sponsors interscholastic athletic teams for young men and women in basketball, cross-country, cheerleading, golf, gymnastics, soccer, swimming, diving, tennis, track & field, volleyball, and water polo. Men may also compete in baseball, football, and wrestling.  Women may compete in badminton, bowling, and softball.

While not sponsored by the IHSA, the school also sponsors teams for men and women in ice hockey and lacrosse, in addition to pom poms.

Some teams have won their respective IHSA sponsored state championship tournament, including Baseball 1985–86, Cross Country (girls) 2003–04, Golf (boys) 1992–93, Gymnastics (girls) 1999–2000, Soccer (boys) 2007–08, Soccer (girls) 2016-17 and 2017–18, and Track & Field (girls) 2006–07.

Notable alumni

 Craig Anderson is a professional hockey goalie, currently playing for the Buffalo Sabres.
 William Beckett, solo artist and lead singer of The Academy Is...
 Paul Bragiel, Colombian National Team cross-country skier, venture capitalist
 Kristin Cavallari is an American television personality, fashion designer, and actress. She is best known for being on reality television series Laguna Beach: The Real Orange County and the spin off series The Hills. She was married to former Chicago Bears quarterback Jay Cutler.
 Kallen Esperian is an international opera soprano.
 Gary Fencik was an NFL safety (1976–87), playing his entire career with the Chicago Bears.  He was a member of the Super Bowl XX champions.
 Jeff Galfer is an actor, producer, and writer.
 Casey Larson is an American ski jumper who competed in both the 2018 Olympics and the 2022 Olympics.
 Katrina Lenk, Tony Award-winning actress, instrumentalist, and singer.
 Laura A. Lopez is a professor of astronomy studying the life cycle of stars
 Scott Lorenz is a professional soccer player for Sporting Kansas City
 Ryan Miller was a professional soccer player and is now a coach at the Portland Timbers Academy
 Scotty Miller is an NFL wide receiver who currently plays for the Tampa Bay Buccaneers. He won super bowl LV with the Tampa Bay Buccaneers.
 Terry Moran is the co-anchor of the late–night news magazine program, Nightline.
 Dan Osinski, Former MLB player (Los Angeles Angels, Kansas City Athletics, Milwaukee Braves, Boston Red Sox, Chicago White Sox, Houston Astros)
 Henry M. Paulson was the U.S. Treasury Secretary (2006–09).
 Veronica Roth author of the Divergent trilogy
 Cynthia Rowley is a fashion designer.
 Peniel Shin of K-Pop boy group BtoB (band)
 Adam Siska, bass player of Say Anything and The Academy Is...
 Brady Smith was an NFL defensive end (1996–2005) who played for the New Orleans Saints and Atlanta Falcons.
 Dan Stevenson (football player) was in the NFL and played for the New England Patriots, Miami Dolphins, and the Houston Texans
 John Trautwein, Former MLB player (Boston Red Sox)
 John W Vanderpoel, noted ornithologist and author of the memoir Full Chase Mode
 Joe Walsh, conservative talk radio host and former Republican Representative of Illinois's 8th congressional district.
 Amy Walter, political analyst who is the publisher and editor-in-chief of The Cook Political Report with Amy Walter
 Dan Wilson was a Major League Baseball catcher (1992–2005), playing most of his career for the Seattle Mariners
 Corinne Wood was the Lieutenant Governor of Illinois (1999–2003)
 Michelle Wu is the mayor of Boston
 Colleen Zenk is an actress, best known for her role as Barbara Ryan for 32 years on the soap opera As the World Turns.

References

External links
 Barrington High School's official website

Public high schools in Illinois
Educational institutions established in 1949
Barrington, Illinois
Schools in Lake County, Illinois
1949 establishments in Illinois